Hendrik-Jan Christiaan Mol (born 29 March 1977) is a former Dutch cricketer. He is a left-handed batsman and a left-arm medium-pace bowler, with an action comparable to Wasim Akram. He is also a quick infielder.

External links
 

1977 births
Netherlands One Day International cricketers
Netherlands Twenty20 International cricketers
Dutch cricketers
Living people
Sportspeople from The Hague